The statue of Jupiter in the Hermitage Museum is a colossal sculpture of the supreme ancient god, created by an unknown Roman master at the end of the 1st century AD. He is one of the most famous exhibits of the museum. The statue of Jupiter is also a significant monument of the Flavian era, bearing the characteristic features of Roman art of this period. The prototype of this sculpture was created by Phidias in the 5th century BC, the legendary statue of Zeus at Olympia, revered as one of the Seven Wonders of the World. It was made for the temple of the supreme god - the central religious building of the Ancient Olympic Games. Found at the end of the 19th century in the Villa of Domitian, the statue of Jupiter ended up in the collection of the Marquis Giampietro Campana. After the ruin of the Marquis, the sculpture was bought by Emperor  Alexander II  and delivered to the Hermitage in 1861.

References 
 
 
 

Roman copies of 5th-century BC Greek sculptures
1st-century Roman sculptures
19th-century archaeological discoveries
Sculptures of Jupiter (mythology)
Sculptures of the Hermitage Museum
Works of uncertain authorship
Statue of Zeus at Olympia
Archaeological discoveries in Italy
Alexander II of Russia